The Moto Guzzi Stelvio 1200 is a dual-sport motorcycle manufactured by the Italian company Moto Guzzi from 2007 to 2016

History
The Stelvio model was introduced in November 2007 at the Milan motorcycle show EICMA for the 2008 model year.  It is named after the alpine Stelvio Pass.

The 2009 model featured changes in engine tuning.  For 2012, the fairing was restyled; electronic dash updated; and fuel capacity was increased.

Specifications
The so-called Quattrovalvole (four-valve) engine comes from the Griso/Breva series and has been optimized with modified camshafts for an improved torque curve.

Engine
Each cylinder head has an overhead chain driven camshaft that actuates the two intake and two exhaust valves.

The 2-into-1 exhaust system made of stainless steel and has a three-way catalytic converter with two oxygen sensors; the emissions are well below the Euro 3 standard. The manufacturer recommends the use of unleaded gasoline with a Research Octane Number of at least 95, 90 R+M/2 in North America.

Suspension
The chassis consists of a tubular steel frame with load-bearing engine. The rear wheel is held by a single-sided swingarm with progressive linkage, which is damped by a Sachs-Boge monoshock with a progressively-acting lever system and 155 mm of travel. Power is transferred to the rear wheel via a shaft integrated into the single-sided swingarm with two joints and an anti-torque reaction support.

Brakes
The front wheel mounts dual disc brakes with cross-drilled, semi-floating 320 mm steel discs and radial-mounted four-piston calipers. At the rear wheel, a cross-drilled 282 mm disc with a dual-piston caliper is mounted. The brake lines are steel reinforced. The brake system on the latest models has standard anti-lock brakes and a switchable traction control system.

NTX differences

The NTX model has factory offroad accessories not found on the base model: hand guards, oil sump guard, aluminum panniers, (not including a topbox),  a larger windscreen and wire spoke wheels.

Critical reaction
Reviewers pegged the Stelvio as a competent competitor for other adventure-touring bikes like the BMW R1200GS and Yamaha Super Ténéré, although heavy. They noted in particular the ability of the NTX, with its high capacity fuel tank, to take riders to offroad destinations where refueling is not available.

References

External links

 (UK)
 (USA)
 (AU) 

Dual-sport motorcycles
Stelvio
Motorcycles introduced in 2007
Motorcycles powered by V engines
Shaft drive motorcycles